Nilton Silva Alonso (born 27 May 1949) is a Brazilian rowing coxswain. He competed at the 1976 Summer Olympics, 1984 Summer Olympics and the 1988 Summer Olympics.

References

External links
 

1949 births
Living people
Brazilian male rowers
Olympic rowers of Brazil
Rowers at the 1976 Summer Olympics
Rowers at the 1984 Summer Olympics
Rowers at the 1988 Summer Olympics
Pan American Games medalists in rowing
Pan American Games silver medalists for Brazil
Rowers at the 1983 Pan American Games
Rowers at the 1987 Pan American Games
Rowers at the 2007 Pan American Games
Medalists at the 2007 Pan American Games